The following is a list of Michigan State Historic Sites in Lapeer County, Michigan. Sites marked with a dagger (†) are also listed on the National Register of Historic Places in Lapeer County, Michigan.


Current listings

See also
 National Register of Historic Places listings in Lapeer County, Michigan

Sources
 Historic Sites Online – Lapeer County. Michigan State Housing Developmental Authority. Accessed March 13, 2011.

References

Lapeer County
State Historic Sites
Tourist attractions in Lapeer County, Michigan